Alt-J (stylised as alt-J, real name Δ) are an English indie rock band formed in 2007 in Leeds. Their lineup includes Joe Newman (guitar/lead vocals), Thom Sonny Green (drums), Gus Unger-Hamilton (keyboards/vocals), and formerly Gwilym Sainsbury (guitar/bass). 

Their debut album An Awesome Wave was released in May 2012 in Europe, and in September 2012 in the United States, and won the 2012 British Mercury Prize. Sainsbury left the band in early 2014. Their second album, This Is All Yours, was released on 22 September 2014 and went straight to number one in the United Kingdom. In February 2022 the band released their fourth studio album The Dream.

Name 
The band's actual name is the triangle-shaped symbol Δ (the capital Greek letter delta). The band often makes references to triangles (for example, the song "Tesselate" mentions "triangles are my favourite shape", and they make triangle symbols with their fingers during concerts), which they say is just due to it being a visually appealing shape.

"Alt-J" comes from the key sequence used to generate the symbol Δ on an Apple Mac computer: +.

The cover art of the band's debut album An Awesome Wave shows an overhead view of the largest river delta in the world, where the Ganges River meets the Bay of Bengal in Bangladesh.

Alt-J were previously known as "Daljit Dhaliwal" and then "Films", but were later forced to change to "alt-J" because an American band called "The Films" already existed.

History

2007–10: Formation and early years
alt-J (∆) were formed when Gwilym (Gwil) Sainsbury (guitar/bass), Joe Newman (guitar/lead vocals), Augustus (Gus) Unger-Hamilton (keyboards/vocals) and Thomas Stuart (Thom Sonny) Green (drums) met at Leeds University in 2007. Unger-Hamilton (younger brother of Ferdy, head of A&R for Polydor Records) studied English, the other three Fine Art. According to Newman, "I basically went to art school to start a band."

In their second year of studies, Newman showed Sainsbury some of his own songs and the pair began recording on GarageBand in their hall rooms with Sainsbury acting as producer. The band's sound arose from living in student halls, where noise had to be kept to a minimum, so that they were unable to use bass guitars or bass drums.

2011–12: An Awesome Wave and touring

After graduating, the band moved to Cambridge where they spent several months working on their music before signing a deal with Infectious Music in December 2011. Their self-titled 4-track demo EP, ∆, was recorded with producer Charlie Andrew in London and featured the tracks "Breezeblocks", "Hand-Made", "Matilda", and "Tessellate". A 7" single containing "Bloodflood" and "Tessellate" was released by Loud and Quiet in October 2011. Their first 2012 release for Infectious Music was the triangle-shaped 10" "Matilda"/"Fitzpleasure". It was followed by "Breezeblocks" which preceded their first album. An Awesome Wave was also produced by Charlie Andrew and compiled at Iguana Studios, Brixton, where the band recorded tracks during the studio's spare time. Their debut album was released on 28 May 2012 in the UK, Europe, and Australia, and on 18 September 2012 in North America via Canvasback Music. The album received some favourable reviews and was described as a "captivating blend of insatiable grooves and profound poignancy". It received a score of 4.8/10 on Pitchfork.

alt-J supported Wild Beasts in April 2012 and played a minor headlining tour around the United Kingdom and Ireland in October of that year. The band have featured regularly on summer festivals, including Latitude, Bestival, Reading and Leeds, T in the Park, Green Man, Pukkelpop, and Lowlands. They also did concert tour in the United States in December 2012 and performed at the Laneway Festival tour in Australia. In November 2012 the band were announced as the winners of the Mercury Prize for their album. Besides the prize-money, the band saw an increase in their profile resulting in An Awesome Wave reaching 13 in the UK album chart. The band would later describe the event as "life-changing, there was a sense of [being] imposters, that the band had somehow got this far without not being a real band, we’re just guys from Leeds who muddled through it and magicked a Mercury award". 

The title "An Awesome Wave" was taken from the Bret Easton Ellis novel American Psycho.

2013–2016: Departure of Sainsbury and This Is All Yours
On 11 January 2014, the band announced that Sainsbury had decided to leave the group, and that they remained friends. In early June 2014, alt-J announced a 2014 tour to take place in North America over October and November. The 23-day tour started in Vancouver, B.C. on 14 October and ended in Washington, D.C. on 19 November. On 9 June 2014, they announced their second album This Is All Yours, that was released on 22 September 2014. This Is All Yours went straight to Number 1 on the UK's Official Albums Chart. alt-J headlined the September 2015 edition of Boston Calling Music Festival. It received a score of 4.0/10 from Pitchfork.  As a replacement for Sainsbury, Cameron Knight became a supporting member for alt-J's live shows.

2017–2020: Relaxer

On 3 March 2017 alt-J began teasing their third studio album on their social media accounts with an audio clip captioned "00110011 01110111 01110111" (Binary code for "3ww"). Stereogum reported later that day that the band's third album would be titled Relaxer and was scheduled for release on 2 June 2017. On 6 March 2017 alt-J released "3WW," which features lead singer Ellie Rowsell of Wolf Alice, as a digital single and announced dates for the Relaxer Tour in support of the album. Three weeks later, on 29 March, they released "In Cold Blood," the second single from Relaxer. In anticipation of their third album, the band released an online video game, whose soundtrack was their single "3WW," as well as announcing in May 2017 that they would be playing a five-date UK tour at seaside venues, starting on 4 September 2017.

On 24 May 2017 alt-J released "Adeline," the third single from Relaxer. The album was released shortly afterwards, on 2 June 2017. "Deadcrush," the fourth single from the album, was released on 12 July and was featured as a soundtrack in the FIFA 18 game. Fifth single "Pleader" arrived on 15 September 2017. Several tracks from Relaxer have since been remixed by a diverse array of artists.

Relaxer was nominated for the 2017 Mercury Prize and received 4.5/10 on Pitchfork.

On 28 September 2018 an alternative version of Relaxer was released. The album, titled Reduxer, is a "rap heavy do-over" of the previous year's record.

2021–present: The Dream

On 16 September 2021, the band announced their first single since 2018, titled "U&ME", would be released 22 September 2021. The single's release coincided with the announcement of their fourth album, The Dream, which was released 11 February 2022.

In popular culture

Alt-J performed "Buffalo" along with Mountain Man for the 2011 film Silver Linings Playbook.

In February 2013 the band announced they would be composing the soundtrack for Toby Jones' new film Leave to Remain.

Their song "Every Other Freckle" was featured on the Netflix show Lovesick, in the season 1 episode "Cressida", in 2014.

In 2014, their song "Tessellate" was featured on Sons of Anarchy, episode 5, season 6.

The song "Hunger of the Pine" is used to begin and end the first season of Unreal released in 2015.

"Fitzpleasure" was also featured in the background of the 2015 film Sisters.

In 2015, their song "Something Good" was featured in the second episode of Life Is Strange.

The band's song "Fitzpleasure" was featured in the main trailer for the video game Battleborn released in 2016.

In 2016, their song "Left Hand Free" was featured in the Marvel Cinematic Universe film Captain America: Civil War.

In 2018, their songs "Tessellate" and "In Cold Blood" are the opening and ending respectively of the anime Ingress, based on the AR game created for Niantic:  Ingress.

In 2019, their songs "Breezeblocks" and "In Cold Blood" were featured on the Netflix series Daybreak, episodes 5 and 10 respectively.

In 2020, their song "Left Hand Free" was featured in the Netflix series Outer Banks.

Also in 2020, "In Cold Blood" was in the Netflix film, Extraction.

Lyrics 
Alt-J has been noted for their post-modern lyrics in their songs that highlight historic events and pop-culture subjects. The song "Taro" is written in reference to Gerda Taro and her role as a war photographer during the Spanish Civil War as well as her relationship to Robert Capa. The song describes the details of Capa's death ("A violent wrench grips mass / Rips light, tears limbs like rags") and imagines Taro's complementary emotions. The visuals in a fan made music video by YouTube user David Dean Burkhart are taken from Godfrey Reggio's experimental film Powaqqatsi.

"Matilda" is a reference to Natalie Portman's character in the film Léon: The Professional. "Fitzpleasure" is the retelling of Hubert Selby Jr.'s short story "Tralala," published in Last Exit to Brooklyn. The story follows a prostitute named Tralala who dies after being gang-raped and raped with a broom, as in the lyrics "dead in the middle / of a c-o-double-m-o-n" and "in your snatch fits pleasure / broom shaped pleasure."

Awards and nominations

In 2012, alt-J's debut album won the British Mercury Prize. alt-J were also nominated for three Brit Awards (British Breakthrough Act, British Album of the Year and British Group of the Year). An Awesome Wave was announced as BBC Radio 6 Music Album of the Year 2012. Three of the tracks from this album gained entry into the Australian 2012 Triple J Hottest 100, with "Something Good" at number 81, "Tessellate" at number 64, and "Breezeblocks" coming third overall. In 2013, An Awesome Wave won Album of the year at the Ivor Novello Awards. This Is All Yours received a Grammy Award nomination for Best Alternative Music Album at the 57th Annual Grammy Awards, and for IMPALA's European Independent Album of the Year Award.

Personnel

Current
 Joe Newman – born  – guitar, bass, lead vocals (2007–present)
 Thom Sonny Green – born  – drums (2007–present)
 Gus Unger-Hamilton – born  – keyboards, bass, vocals (2007–present)

Touring
 Cameron Knight – guitar, bass, sampler (2014–2016)

Past
 Gwil Sainsbury – born  – guitar, bass (2007–2014)

Timeline

Discography

Studio albums
 An Awesome Wave (2012)
 This Is All Yours (2014)
 Relaxer (2017)
The Dream (2022)

References

External links

 
 Official website

 
English indie rock groups
British indie pop groups
Musical groups established in 2007
Indie rock groups from Leeds
Musical quartets
English art rock groups
Folktronica musicians
Atlantic Records artists
Infectious Music artists
Ivor Novello Award winners